Vida en el Valle is a free, bilingual (English/Spanish) newspaper covering ethnic society and culture. The newspaper was first published on August 15, 1990 and is published as part of The Fresno Bee, in Fresno, California. The paper is published weekly on Wednesdays with separate editions in five cities: Fresno, Merced, Modesto, and Stockton. The paper had expanded its circulation to Sacramento in 2006, but closed that operation in 2017. The paper's circulation is 122,000 copies.

The paper is owned and published by the McClatchy Company. Vida en el Valley's website is presented in both English and Spanish.

The president and publisher is Tom Cullinan, and the editor is Juan Esparza Loera.

History 
The newspaper began publishing as part of the Fresno Bee in 1990, with an initial circulation of 19,000. Their initial objective was to produce a paper in both English and Spanish, to help reach readers whose first or primary language was Spanish. They also focused on topics of interest to Latino communities in and around Fresno, beyond specialized topics like immigration, such as community events, local issues, and advertisements for local businesses. Juan Esparza Loera has been editor of the paper since its founding.

In 2008, Vida en el Valle'''s publisher, McClatchy created a partnership with ImpreMedia to share Spanish-language content.

In 2011, Vida en el Valle joined the newly-formed Hispanic National Preprint Network (Hispanic NPN), a network aimed at increasing and strengthening market coverage for member papers. Also in 2011, McClatchy created a partnership to make CIPS Marketing the exclusive distributor of Vida en el Valle'', as part of a TMC conversation program.

Awards

National Association of Hispanic Publications Jose Marti Awards

California News Publishers Association Better Newspaper Contest

McClatchy President’s Awards

References

Weekly newspapers published in California